Poland syndrome is a birth defect characterized by an underdeveloped chest muscle and short webbed fingers on one side of the body. There may also be short ribs, less fat, and breast and nipple abnormalities on the same side of the body. Typically, the right side is involved. Those affected generally have normal movement and health.

The cause of Poland syndrome is unknown. One theory is that it is due to disruption of blood flow during embryonic development. It is generally not inherited, and no genes that contribute to the disorder have been identified. Diagnosis of Poland syndrome is based on its symptoms. Often, those with the syndrome remain undiagnosed, and some may not realize they have it until puberty.

Treatment of Poland syndrome depends on its severity and may include surgical correction. The syndrome affects about 1 in 20,000 newborns, and males are affected twice as often as females. It is named after English surgeon Sir Alfred Poland, who described the condition when he was a student in 1841.

Signs and symptoms

A list of the common side effects broken down by frequency.

Very frequent
 Abnormal gastrointestinal tract
 Absent pectoral muscles
 Brachydactyly (Short fingers)
 Dextrocardia
 Diaphragmatic hernia/defect
 Humerus absent/abnormal
 Liver/biliary tract anomalies
 Maternal diabetes
 Oligodactyly/missing fingers
 Radius absent/abnormal
 Rhizomelic micromelia (relatively shorter proximal segment of the limbs compared to the middle and the distal segments)
 Sparsity or abnormality of axillary hair on affected side
 Syndactyly of fingers (webbing)
 Ulna absent/abnormal
 Upper limb asymmetry
 Abnormal rib
 Simian crease on affected side

Frequent
 Hypoplastic/absent nipples
 Scapula anomaly

Occasional
 Agenesis/hypoplasia of kidneys
 Encephalocele/exencephaly
 Abnormal morphology of hypothalamic-hypophyseal axis
 Abnormal function of hypothalamic-hypophyseal axis
 Microcephaly
 Preaxial polydactyly
 Ureteric anomalies (reflux/duplex system)
 Vertebral segmentation anomaly

It is usually considered a unilateral condition. Some have claimed that the term can be applied in bilateral presentation, but others recommend using alternate terminology in those cases.

Causes
The cause of Poland syndrome is unknown. However, an interruption of the embryonic blood supply to the arteries that lie under the collarbone (subclavian arteries) at about the 46th day of embryonic development is the prevailing theory.

The subclavian arteries normally supply blood to embryonic tissues that give rise to the chest wall and hand. Variations in the site and extent of the disruption may explain the range of signs and symptoms that occur in Poland syndrome. Abnormality of an embryonic structure called the apical ectodermal ridge, which helps direct early limb development, may also be involved in this disorder.

Diagnosis

Poland syndrome is usually diagnosed at birth, based upon the physical characteristics. Imaging techniques such as a CT scan may reveal the extent to which the muscles are affected. The syndrome varies in severity and as such is often not reported until puberty, when lopsided growth becomes apparent.

Treatment

Technique 
The complete or partial absence of the pectoralis muscle is the malformation that defines Poland syndrome. It can be treated by inserting a custom implant designed by CAD (computer aided design). A 3D reconstruction of the patient's chest is done using an implant shaped from a medical scan and designed to be perfectly adapted to the anatomy. The implant is made of medical grade silicone rubber. The treatment is purely cosmetic and does not restore the patient's imbalanced upper body strength.

The Poland syndrome malformations are morphological, so correction by custom implant is the first-line treatment. This technique allows a wide variety of patients to be treated with good outcomes. Poland Syndrome can be associated with bones, subcutaneous and mammary atrophy: the first, as for pectus excavatum, is successfully corrected by a custom implant, while the others can require surgical intervention such as lipofilling or silicone breast implant, in a second operation.

Surgery 
The surgery takes place under general anaesthesia and lasts less than 1 hour. The surgeon prepares the locus to the size of the implant after performing an  axillary incision, then inserts the implant beneath the skin. The closure is made in two planes.

The implant replaces the pectoralis major muscle, thus enabling the thorax to be symmetrical and, in women, the breast as well. If necessary, especially in the case of women, a second operation will complement the result by the implantation of a breast implant and / or lipofilling.

Lipomodelling is progressively used in the correction of breast and chest wall deformities. In Poland syndrome, this technique appears to be a major advance that will probably revolutionize the treatment of severe cases. This is mainly due to its ability to achieve previously unachievable quality of reconstruction with minimal scarring.

Epidemiology
Poland syndrome affects males three times as often as females and affects the right side of the body twice as often as the left. The incidence is estimated to range from one in 7,000 to one in 100,000 live births.

History

It was named in 1962 by Patrick Clarkson, a New Zealand-born British plastic surgeon working at Guy's Hospital and Queen Mary's Hospital, London. He noticed that three of his patients had both a hand deformity and an underdeveloped breast on the same side. He discussed this with his colleague at Guy's Hospital, Dr Philip Evans, who agreed that the syndrome was "not widely appreciated". Clarkson found a reference to a similar deformity published by Alfred Poland, an English surgeon, over a hundred years earlier in Guy's Hospital reports, in 1841. Clarkson was able to find the hand specimen dissected by Poland, which was still held in the hospital pathology museum.

Poland had dissected a convict known as George Elt, who was said to be unable to draw his hand across his chest. Poland noted the chest wall deformity, and this was illustrated in his article; the hand was also dissected and preserved for posterity in Guy's Hospital museum where it remains today. It cannot be truly said that Poland described this syndrome because he only described one isolated case. Clarkson published his series of three cases and named the syndrome after Poland in his article.

Notable cases
 TV presenter Jeremy Beadle (1948–2008) was known for having this condition. His Poland syndrome manifested itself in the form of his disproportionately small right hand.
 Olympic boxer Jérôme Thomas is also affected by Poland syndrome, as his left arm and hand are significantly shorter and smaller than his right. Thomas also lacks a left pectoral muscle.
 PGA Tour golfer Bryce Molder has Poland syndrome, with an absent left pectoral muscle and a small left hand. Several surgeries in his childhood repaired syndactyly on the left hand.
 Actor Ted Danson, famous for starring in the TV show Cheers, admitted he had the condition in 2000 to Orange Coast magazine and said that he was bullied as a child because of it.
 Formula One World Champion Fernando Alonso is affected by Poland syndrome; he is missing the right pectoral muscle.
 Cricketer Lewis Hatchett was born with Poland syndrome.
 Australian Paralympian Mathew Silcocks is affected by Poland syndrome.
 Hailey Dawson of Nevada (born 2010) has a missing right pectoral muscle and is missing three fingers on her right hand due to the condition. She has thrown out the ceremonial first pitch at all 30 Major League Baseball parks, using a 3D-printed robotic right hand fitted for her by engineers at the University of Nevada, Las Vegas.
 Actor Gary Burghoff, best known for the television series M*A*S*H, has Poland syndrome manifesting in brachydactyly on his left hand. It was seldom noticeable throughout the show's run, Burghoff usually putting his hand in his pocket or concealing it under props such as the clipboards carried by his character Radar O'Reilly.
 English singer-songwriter Matt Goss has Poland syndrome, manifesting as a missing lower pectoral on his right side.

References

External links 

Congenital disorders of musculoskeletal system
Syndromes with dysmelia
Rare syndromes
Wikipedia medicine articles ready to translate
Intersex variations